Celanida montana is a species of beetle in the family Carabidae, the only species in the genus Celanida.

References

Psydrinae
Taxa named by François-Louis Laporte, comte de Castelnau